Time Clocks is the fifteenth solo studio album by American blues rock musician Joe Bonamassa, released through J&R Adventures in North America and Provogue Records in Europe on October 29, 2021. "Notches", "The Heart That Never Waits" and the title track were released as singles prior to the album.

Track listing

Charts

References

2021 albums
Albums produced by Kevin Shirley
Joe Bonamassa albums